Lunay may refer to:
 Lunay, Loir-et-Cher, a commune in the Loir-et-Cher department of central France
 Lunay (singer), Puerto Rican singer and rapper